Thomas William Poskett (26 December 1909 – 19 December 1972) was an English professional footballer who played as a goalkeeper.

References

1909 births
1972 deaths
Footballers from County Durham
English footballers
Association football goalkeepers
Chopwell Institute F.C. players
Crook Town A.F.C. players
Grimsby Town F.C. players
Lincoln City F.C. players
Notts County F.C. players
Tranmere Rovers F.C. players
Crewe Alexandra F.C. players
Northwich Victoria F.C. players
English Football League players
People from Esh Winning